Prāta Vētra, known internationally as Brainstorm, is a Latvian pop/rock band. The band became popular internationally in 2000 when they finished third in the Eurovision Song Contest 2000 with the song "My Star".

History

BrainStorm formation and first years (1989–1996) 
The band was formed in the summer of 1989 in Jelgava, Latvia by four former classmates – Renārs Kaupers, Jānis Jubalts, Gundars Mauševics and Kaspars Roga. Soon after, their classmate Māris Mihelsons also joined the band.

In September 1992 Brainstorm released their first single "Jo tu nāc" (Because You Come) and finished 9th in the Latvian popular music contest, the "Microphones" poll. After this came their first album, Vairāk nekā skaļi (More than Loud) 1993. The main single from that album is "Ziema" (Winter), which also has a video.

1994 was the quietest period in the band's history, although in that year they released the maxi-single Vietu nav (No vacancies) with only 500 copies. In 1995 one of the band's earlier songs "Lidmašīnas" (Airplanes) became one of the most commercially successful singles in Latvia and song of the year on Radio Super FM. The band also performed in Germany and the United Kingdom. After experimenting with alternative music, Brainstorm returned to mainstream music and released their next album Veronika. The most popular songs from the album were "Dārznieks" (Gardener), "Apelsīns" (Orange) and "Lidmašīnas" (Airplanes), and attendance at the band's concerts increased.

At the end of the year, Latvian radio stations started to play the song "Tavas mājas manā azotē" (Under my wing is your home), which topped Latvian Airplay charts for 9 weeks and became the biggest hit of 1996.

Contract with Microphone Records, Eurovision Song contest (1997–2000) 
The next step was signing a contract with Microphone Records, one of the biggest record companies in Latvia and releasing the next album, Viss ir tieši tā kā tu vēlies (Everything's the Way You Want It) in 1997. The album attained gold status. The main tracks from the album were "Viss ir tieši tā kā tu vēlies", "Mans draugs" (My Friend), "Neatgriešanās" (No Return) and "Tavas mājas manā azotē". Subsequently, the band received offers to manage TV and radio shows and to take part in musical performances at Dailes Theatre in Riga as part of The Good Soldier Švejk, which became the most visited theatre show in Latvia. Brainstorm's first international single was recorded in 1998 in Germany with Volker Hinkel, the producer of Fool's Garden. This single was "Under my wing", the English version of "Tavas mājas manā azotē". The single was aired in the Baltic states and also other countries. Soon after this, the band was awarded the Grand Prix prize at the Karlshamn music festival in Sweden.

In 1999, Brainstorm released their fourth album Starp divām saulēm and their first international album Among the Suns, which is the English version of "Starp divām saulēm". The album was recorded in Sweden and Denmark. All five singles from the album – "Puse no sirds" (Half of a heart), "Starp divām saulēm" (Among the suns), "Lec" (English version – "Try"), "Prom uz siltajām salām" (Eng. version – "Ain't it funny") and "Tu izvēlējies palikt" (Eng. version – "Welcome to my country") reached the top of the Latvian radio charts shortly after release. On 13 May 2000 in Sweden, in only 3 minutes, Prāta Vētra or Brainstorm became an internationally noticed band when they participated in the 45th Eurovision Song Contest. Their song "My Star" achieved 3rd place among 24 contestants with their country's debut. "My Star" was played internationally thereafter. In August 2000, after more than 10 years of performing, The best of Brainstorm '89-'99 was released and included the band's most popular, interesting and unreleased songs.

New albums, MTV awards (2001–2010) 

The Online album was released in 2001 or, in the Latvian version, – Kaķēns, kurš atteicās no jūrasskolas. The album featured the track "Maybe." The video was shot in Prague. The second single "Waterfall" also achieved success, and had a video which was shot in Finland. Another track "Spogulīt, spogulīt" (Mirror, mirror), contains the lines of the fairytale about Snow White by the Brothers Grimm.

The next album Dienās, kad lidlauks pārāk tāls or A Day Before Tomorrow was released in 2003. The lead singles of this album – "Colder" and "A day before tomorrow" ("Plaukstas lieluma pavasaris") – were produced by German producer Alex Silva. The majority of the album was produced by UK producer Steve Lyon. The album was recorded in Germany and Denmark. In 2003 Brainstorm were the support band for The Rolling Stones at their concert in Prague. Brainstorm presented a saxophone to Mick Jagger for his birthday.

In 2004, one of the band founders died on the night between 22 and 23 May in a car accident on the highway between Riga and Jelgava – bassist Gundars Mauševics or as his friends called him – Mumiņš was only 29 years old.

Despite this loss, the other band members continued working.

In 2004 Brainstorm and a well-known Russian band Bi-2 recorded the song "Skol'zkie Ulitsy" (Slippery Streets), which was included on their album "Inomarki", released on 2 March 2004 and which reached number 1 on radio charts in Latvia, Ukraine and Russia.

In 2005 Brainstorm released their album Četri krasti. In its recording a fifth person took part: bass guitarist Ingars Viļums. He also took part in a tour over Russia which presented the album.

The album featured tracks such as "Četri krasti", "Rudens" and "Pilots Tims". On 21 August 2005 Brainstorm played a concert in Mežaparks attended by 40,000 people. At the beginning of 2006 Brainstorm released an English version of Četri krasti – Four Shores. The lead single "Thunder Without Rain" became popular in most of Europe and received airplay on MTV Europe and VH1 Europe.

They received the MTV Europe Music award for Best Baltic Act in 2006. In 2009, War, an album written singularly in Latvian and Russian was released into Eastern Europe with reasonable success, the English version, Years and Seconds, followed a year later with more popular audience feedback, although the meanings of several songs had to altered to fit English lyrics. Concerts have been held by the band recently in Western Europe and they continue to gain popularity in the United Kingdom due to their similarity to Beirut.

2012 

The band was nominated in four categories at the 2012 Annual Latvian Music Recording Awards, receiving awards in three of them.

The album "Another Still Life", released in 2012, was written and recorded in the historic town of Hudson, in the Hudson Valley upstate NY, and was mixed in a small studio beneath Radiohead's management office in Oxford, England.

The lyrics for the album's title track are made up entirely from the titles of paintings, rearranged and formed into a cohesive song.

The song "Lantern" from their album "Another Still Life" (Available on i-tunes worldwide) tells the story of the band's childhood, the forming of the band and of their stadium size success in Eastern Europe.

After the album "Another Still Life" BrainStorm had a tour in native Latvia gathering 89,500 people in 7 dates, in comparison with Latvia's population of 2 million.

During the summer of 2012 BrainStorm tours in native Latvia gathering 89 500 people in 7 dates. In autumn of 2012, they toured Russia in support of the album release there. On the festival season of 2012 BrainStorm played following festivals – The Great Escape (UK), Music Matters (Singapore), Rock For People (Czech Republic), Nashestvije, Kubana, Krilja and Red Rocks (Russia), Watergate (Estonia), Sziget (Hungary), Vilnius Music Week (Lithuan2013ia), Culture Co2013e (USA), and Live Sessions Day (Spain).

2013 
In June 2013 BrainStorm played in the "Glastonbury Festival" and so became the first band from the Baltics to be playing in the festival.

2015 

At the start of the year, the band completed a new album, with Alex Silva as the producer, who has worked with BrainStorm before, on the 2006 album "Four Shores". The work on the new compositions took place in Berlin, at the legendary Hansa Studio. Traditionally, the first releases of their albums are always held in the mother country of the band – Latvia. And on 10 February 2015, the first single "Ziemu apēst" from the Latvian version of the album named "7 soļi svaiga gaisa" ("7 Steps of Fresh Air") was released. The same day ticket sales for the summer tour of the band were launched. On 19 May, two versions of the new album were released simultaneously – "7 soļi svaiga gaisa" for Latvia and "7 Steps of Fresh Air" for Russia and the CIS. The Russian version of the album included ten songs, three of which were in Russian and one in the native language of the band – Latvian. The other songs of the album were in English. In Russia, the album was released on the Warner Music Russia label. The very first track from the new record named Epoch, having stayed on the chart "Чартова Дюжина" ("Chart's Dozen") for almost five months, topped it twice during that period and, as a result, received the 2015 award "Chart Leader 2015". The second track from the new album "Пропуск" ("Pass") topped the chart "Чартова Дюжина" in December 2015 and stayed on the top for over a month. BrainStorm opened the summer season at the "Нашествие" festival (Russia), where they performed as headliners on Saturday, 4 July. The musicians continued their summer concerts with a big Latvian tour, gathering more than 100,000 spectators during their four concerts in Valmiera, Ventspils, Jelgava and Riga. On 26 October, prior to an autumn concert season, a documentary about the band was shown in Riga – "BrainStorm: Between Shores" – the first autobiographic film about BrainStorm and their 25-year-long history. For the first time during the entire period of the band's existence, its members told their life stories in a very sincere way, with all the available turns and twists. Following the Riga premiere, the film was shown in cinemas throughout Latvia, enjoying success. On the same day, it was announced that the album "7 Steps of Fresh Air" had entered the first round of the 58th GRAMMY award's official list of candidates for the best POP album of the year. On 30 October, the band launched a series of concerts to support the release of their new album with their first European concert – in London. On 11 November the musicians performed in Almaty. On 12 November, jointly with Ultra Production and "Наше радио", BrainStorm released their first vinyl album "7 Steps Of Fresh Air", which was presented in Moscow's Duran Bar prior to the start of their Russian tour. On 14 November, for the first time, the musicians presented their new programme to Moscow spectators at Stadium Live, and already the next day BrainStorm went on their longest Russian tour of recent years. During a period of three weeks, the musicians visited Kaliningrad, Tomsk, Krasnoyarsk, Samara, Kazan, Ekaterinburg, Chelyabinsk, Voronezh, Saint Petersburg and other cities.

In the aftermath of annexation of Crimea by the Russian Federation Brainstorm drew condemnation by being one of the headliners for the 2015 Russian rock festival Nashestvie, a significant part of which featured Russian military parades, plane flyovers, war songs and recruitment into the Russian army. A few days later Brainstorm responded by saying: "We play our music to people, not flags, and we think that culture, just like sports, should stand over politics, as it's a direct link to people in the language of the heart."

On 1 December, BrainStorm's new DVD "7 soļi svaiga gaisa" ("7 Steps of Fresh Air"), filmed during their Riga concert, was released. It is available in DVD format and a digital HD version. On the same day, the continuation of the 2016 local summer tour was announced and the date of the next concert – to be held on 20 August 2016 in Liepaja, at the Daugava Stadium.

2016 

"Brainstorm" started the New Year announcing the first dates for the "7 Steps of fresh air" Spring Concert Tour in Europe. In total, they played 7 shows – 2 in the Baltic countries (Estonia and Lithuania) and 5 cities in the United Kingdom.

On 23 January, "BrainStorm's" song "Ziemu apēst" was awarded as the most valuable song of 2015 at "Latvian Radio 2" annual award ceremony "Muzikālā Banka".

On 13 February, the IX annual award ceremony of "Nashe Radio" was held in Russia and BrainStorm got awarded in the category "Leaders of the Chart" for the song "Epoha". This song has been holding in the chart "Чартова дюжина" for a record-long time – almost 4 months, during which it reached the very top twice – in July and August.

On 15 February, "BrainStorm" released the song "Little Raindrops" that is the English version of the previously released "Ziemu apēst" from the album "7 Steps of fresh Air". The first live performance of "Little Raindrops" was in the final show of the Lithuanian "X Factor".

In the annual Latvian Music Record Awards ceremony "Zelta Mikrofons" ("Golden Microphone") "BrainStorm" received an award for their live concert "7 Steps of Fresh Air" from the tour's final concert in Riga and an award for "Alfa song of the year" from the "Alfa" shopping centre. That is the only prize where the winner is determined by a public vote and so the song "Ziemu apēst" got the most votes from the listeners, which brought the band their 31st Golden Microphone award in total.

In the middle of the year, the band also participated in several music festivals, such as "Янтарный Пляж" (Amber Beach) in Kaliningrad, the festival "A-Fest" in Minsk and "Weekend Festival Baltic" in Pärnu.

On 20 August "BrainStorm" held their only concert in Latvia – stadium "Daugava", Liepāja, gathering more than 28 000 people not only from Latvia but also the Baltic Countries, as well as the United States, Canada, Australia, Russia and even Japan. Demand for concert tickets was so great that even before the start of the concert, it was declared a sold-out.

At the end of the year, "BrainStorm" went to Moscow with their solo concert. In 2015 the band presented their latest album "7 Steps of fresh air" in the capital of Russia and it was very well received.
During the year the songs from the album managed to not only rank the Russian radio charts but also resound in music festivals – such as "Bosco Fresh Fest", "VK Fest", "A-Fest", "Нашествие", where "BrainStorm" performed as headliners.

The documentary "BrainStorm: Between shores" got awarded with National cinematography award "Lielais Kristaps" in the category "Best sound engineer" as well as Delfi.lv public choice award.

2017 

The members of BrainStorm decided not to take a break to record a new album, whose preliminary release was scheduled for spring 2018, but to create new material in a rock-'n'-roll tour environment, while travelling and discovering new territories and cities. In the summer, the artists played at the Ukrainian festival Atlas Weekend and in the autumn went on a tour in Russia, which was named "Между берегами" ("Between Shores") and included the following cities: Moscow, Saint Petersburg, Ekaterinburg, Tyumen, Omsk, Perm, Nizhny Novgorod. During breaks between performances and while travelling between the cities, the musicians created material for their album, as they were accompanied by the album's Swedish sound producers, who, being excellent musicians themselves, took an active part in the onstage performances. Prior to the start of the tour, Brainstorm presented the first single from their future album – the song "Как я искал тебя", recorded with Marina Kravets, the only female resident of the Comedy Club. Two more singles followed – the song "Tevis Dēļ", released in Latvia, and the international composition "My Mind's So Lost (On You)". Within the framework of the autumn tour, special screenings of the documentary "Brainstorm: Between Shores", organised by the cinema network Karo, took place in Russian cities. The "Between Shores" tour was continued in April 2018 and was completed with the release of the new record. At the very end of 2017, Brainstorm announced their first performances of 2018 – a spring series of concerts in Great Britain, Ireland and Lithuania, a summer series in Latvia and participation in the festival "Дикая Мята".

2018 

On 25 April, Prāta Vētra released their 13th record with the title "About the Boy Who Plays the Tin Drum". It features songs in Russian, English and Latvian. To create the artwork for the new album, BrainStorm have yet again co-worked with the legendary photographer and director Anton Corbijn. On the eve of the record release, i.e. on 12 April, Brainstorm also released two new music videos. In the Russian-speaking territory and internationally, a video clip for the song "Wonderful Day" was released, whose fragments were shot at the International Space Station by the Roscosmos cosmonaut Sergey Ryazansky (Сергей Рязанский). And in Latvia, a separate premiere took place – the main track from the album's Latvian version was released "Par to zēnu, kas sit skārda bungas" ("About the boy who plays the tin drums"). Prior to the album's release, the musicians announced their participation in two more summer festivals – "Стереолето" in Saint Petersburg and "Кинопробы" in Okulovka, as well as the date of the Moscow presentation of the "Wonderful Day" album, to be held on 13 December in the Crocus City Hall. Apart from the musical announcements, BrainStorm pleased with the news about their participation in the Russian film "7 ужинов" ("7 Dinners") by the director Kirill Pletnyov (Кирилл Плетнёв), to be released in early 2019, where the musicians played themselves in the culmination scene of this romantic comedy.

Members 
 Renārs Kaupers – vocals, guitar (1989–present)
 Jānis Jubalts – guitar (1989–present)
 Māris Mihelsons – keyboard, accordion and other instruments (1989–present)
 Kaspars Roga – drums, percussion (1989–present)
 Gundars Mauševics – bass guitar (1989–2004, died 2004)

Festivals 
 Glastonbury (Somerset, England)
 Sziget (Budapest, Hungary)
 Atlas Weekend (Kyiv, Ukraine)
 Kryl'ja (Moscow, Russia)
 Nashestvie (Tver Oblast, Russia)
 Red Rocks  (Chelyabinsk, Russia)
 Weekend Festival Baltic (Pärnu, Estonia)
 Rock For People (Hradec Králové, Czech Republic)
 Watergate World Music Festival (Estonia)
 Culture Collide Festival (Los Angeles, California, US)
 Live Sessions Day (Spain), etc.

Discography

International albums 
Among the Suns (2000) (FI #13; BEL #42; SWE #47)
Online (2001)
A Day Before Tomorrow (2003) (POL #47)
Four Shores (2006)
Years and Seconds (2010)
Another Still Life (2012)
7 Steps of Fresh Air (2015)
Wonderful Day (2018)
About the Boy Who Plays the Tin Drum (2018)
Lonesome Moon (2021)

International singles 
"My Star" (2000) (BEL #8; SWE #22)
"Weekends Are Not My Happy Days" (2000) (BEL #13)
"Maybe" (2001) (POL #1; GRE #8)
"Vyhodnye" (2004) (UKR #21)

Albums in Latvian 
Vairāk nekā skaļi ("More Than Loud") (1993)
Vietu nav ("No Place") (1994)
Veronika (1996)
Viss ir tieši tā kā tu vēlies ("Everything Is Exactly As You Want") (1997)
Starp divām saulēm ("Between Two Suns") (1999)
Izlase '89-'99 (2000)
Kaķēns, kurš atteicās no jūrasskolas ("The Kitten Who Didn't Want to Give Up"; the band's translation. Otherwise, it is "The kitten that refused to go to the sea school"; a Latvian expression that means "the kitten that refused to be drowned") (2001)
Dienās, kad lidlauks pārāk tāls ("The Days When the Airfield Is Too Far") (2003)
Veronika (2004)
Četri krasti ("Four Shores") (2005)
Tur kaut kam ir jābūt ("There has to be something") (2008)
Vēl viena klusā daba ("One more still life") (2012)
7 soļi svaiga gaisa ("7 steps of fresh air") (2015)
Par to zēnu, kas sit skārda bungas (2018)
Gads bez kalendāra (2021)

Albums in Russian 
Шаг ("Step") (2009)
Чайки На Крышах ("Seagulls on the Rooftops") (2012)
7 Steps of Fresh Air (2015)
Wonderful Day (2018)
Год без календаря ("Year without calendar") (2021)

References

External links 

 Official website
 Official Russian website
 VK community

EMI Records artists
Latvian pop music groups
Latvian rock music groups
Latvian indie rock groups
Latvian alternative rock groups
Eurovision Song Contest entrants for Latvia
MTV Europe Music Award winners
Eurovision Song Contest entrants of 2000
Musical groups established in 1989
Musical quartets
Soviet rock music groups